La Tour may refer to:

Places

Canada
 Port La Tour, Nova Scotia

France
 La Tour, Alpes-Maritimes
 La Tour, Haute-Savoie
 La Tour-Blanche, Dordogne
 La Tour-d'Aigues, Vaucluse
 La Tour-d'Auvergne, Puy-de-Dôme
 La Tour-de-Salvagny, Rhône 
 La Tour-de-Sçay, Doubs
 La Tour-du-Crieu, Ariège
 La Tour-du-Meix, Jura
 La Tour-du-Pin, Isère
 La Tour-en-Jarez, Loire
 La Tour-Saint-Gelin, Indre-et-Loire
 La Tour-sur-Orb, in the Hérault

Switzerland
 La Tour-de-Trême, Fribourg
 La Tour-de-Peilz, Vaud

United States
 La Tour, Missouri

Other uses
 La Tour (comic), comic book by François Schuiten and Benoît Peeters
 La Tour (surname)
 Château Latour, a French wine estate in the north-west of Bordeaux
 LaTour, American musician, disc jockey and voice over artist

See also
 
 Latour (disambiguation)
 Latur
 Tour (disambiguation)